Limbo, in comics, may refer to:

 Limbo (DC Comics), a location in the DC Comics universe
 Limbo (Marvel Comics), a location in the Marvel Comics universe

See also
Limbo (disambiguation)

hu:Limbó (képregény)